Zimmerbach is a river of Thuringia, Germany. It flows for 3 kilometres before joining the Salza near Bad Langensalza.

See also
List of rivers of Thuringia

Rivers of Thuringia
Rivers of Germany